Sycamore Creek is a tributary of the Red Cedar River in the state of Michigan in the United States. Via the Red Cedar River, it is part of the watershed of the Grand River, which flows to Lake Michigan. Via Lake Michigan and the Great Lakes system, it is part of the larger watershed of the St. Lawrence River.

Sycamore Creek flows for its entire length in Ingham County.

Watershed characteristics

The Sycamore Creek watershed consists of three HUC-12 subwatersheds, as defined by the United States Geological Survey:

Terrain in the Sycamore Creek watershed is generally rolling, with hilly and swampy sections. According to a watershed management plan for the Red Cedar River submitted in 2015 by the Michigan State University Institute of Water Research (IWR), the Sycamore Creek watershed had a population of approximately 72,975 at the 2010 census, with most of that population living in the lower (northern) part of the watershed, which includes part of the city of Lansing and nearby urbanized areas. Land use in the watershed as of 2006 was as follows:

A survey conducted for the same IWR report found approximately 2,478 large farm animals living in the watershed. Approximately 2,504 homes in the watershed were serviced by septic systems as of 2012.

Recreational trails have been built alongside or near portions of the creek in Mason (the Hayhoe Riverwalk), Delhi Township (the Sycamore Trail), and Lansing (the southern part of the Lansing River Trail).

Tributaries
This is a list of named streams in the Sycamore Creek watershed, as identified by the National Hydrography Dataset.  The list's default order is from the mouth of the creek to its source.

See also
List of rivers of Michigan

Notes

References 

Rivers of Michigan
Rivers of Ingham County, Michigan
Geography of Lansing, Michigan
Tributaries of Lake Michigan